Baron Ap-Adam was a title in the Peerage of England. It was created by Writ of summons to Parliament of John Ap-Adam in 1297 until his death in 1311, when the title became in abeyance.

Baron Ap-Adam (1297)
John Ap-Adam: He summoned to parliament on 26 January 1297. He was again summoned from 6 February 1299 until 12 December 1309. He died in 1311 and the title became in abeyance amongst his descendants.

References

1297 establishments in England
1299 establishments in England
Abeyant baronies in the Peerage of England
Noble titles created in 1299